Anna Maria Mead Chalmers (born Anna Maria Campbell Hickman July 23, 1809 – ) was an American journalist.

Biography 
Anna Maria Mead Chalmers was born on July 23, 1809 in Detroit.

In February 1830, she married George Alexander Otis, Jr. He died in 1831. In 1837, she married Rev. Zachariah Mead. He died on 27 November 1840. In 1841, she opened a Richmond boarding school, Mrs. Mead’s School. On 3 January 1856, she married David Chalmers. In 1863, she moved to New York. 

She wrote children's books. Her work appeared in the Boston Home Journal, the New York Churchman, the New York Tribune, and the Southern Literary Messenger.

Chalmers died on 8 December 1891 in Albemarle County, Virginia. She was buried in Shockoe Cemetery.

Works 
 Sketches By A Christian's Way-side, H. Hooker 1846.

References

Further reading 
 Edward Campbell Mead, A Biographical Sketch, Anna Maria Mead Chalmers: In Memoriam, E. Waddey Company, 1893

External links
 http://www.lva.virginia.gov/public/dvb/classified-index.asp

1809 births
1891 deaths
Created via preloaddraft
Journalists from Michigan
19th-century American journalists
American children's writers